is a Japanese mixed martial artist and former freestyle wrestler who currently competes in the bantamweight division. Competing at 61 kilograms, Nakamura became the 2017 U23 World Champion during his wrestling career, before retiring at age 25 to pursue mixed martial arts.

Background 
Rinya is the son of Kozo Nakamura, who was involved in the early development of Shooto in the 90's. Having begun wrestling at the age of five, Nakamura's first notable accomplishment in the sport of freestyle wrestling was a bronze medal from the Cadet World Championships in 2011. A multiple-time Japanese National medalist at two different weight classes, his most remarkable achievement of his career came at the 2017 U23 World Championships, where he became the champion at 61 kilograms. After the delay of the 2020 Summer Olympics due to the COVID-19 pandemic, Nakamura decided to retire from wrestling and hop into the sport of mixed martial arts.

Mixed martial arts career

Early career 
In April 2020, Nakamura announced his serious intentions of competing in MMA. Nakamura made his professional debut against Takumi Arai in a mixed martial arts reality show Fighting Dreamers on 15 May 2021. He won the fight via first-minute knockout.

He then made his sophomore appearance against Akuri Ronda at Shooto 0725 on 25 July 2021. He won the bout via second-round knockout.

Nakamura faced Yasuyuki Nojiri at Shooto 0116 on January 16, 2022. He won the fight via first-minute technical knockout.

On April 24, 2022, he fought against Aliandro Caetano in POUNDSTORM, and although he was punched in round 1 and cut his right eyelid leading to intense bleeding, he utilised his takedown advantage and won the 3-0 decision.

Road to UFC 
Nakamura faced Gugun Gusman in the Quarter-Finals of the Bantamweight tournament on June 9, 2022 in Road to UFC: Episode 3. He won the bout in the first round via americana submission.

Nakamura faced Shohei Nose in the Semi-Finals of the Bantamweight tournament on October 23, 2022 at Road to UFC: Episode 6. He won the bout in the first round, knocking out Nose.

In the finals of the tournament, Nakamura faced Toshiomi Kazama on February 4, 2023 at UFC Fight Night: Lewis vs. Spivak. He won the fight via knockout in the first round. This win earned Nakamura his first Performance of the Night bonus award.

Championships and accomplishments

Mixed martial arts
Ultimate Fighting Championship
Performance of the Night (One time) 
Road to UFC Bantamweight Tournament Winner.

Mixed martial arts record 

|-
|Win
|align=center|7–0
|Toshiomi Kazama
|KO (punch)
|UFC Fight Night: Lewis vs. Spivak
|
|align=center|1
|align=center|0:33
|Las Vegas, Nevada, United States
|
|-
|Win
|align=center|6–0
|Shohei Nose
|KO (punches)
|Road to UFC: Episode 6
|
|align=center|1
|align=center|2:21
|Abu Dhabi, United Arab Emirates
|
|-
|Win
|align=center|5–0
|Gugun Gusman
|Submission (keylock)
|Road to UFC: Episode 3
|
|align=center|1
|align=center|3:24
|Kallang, Singapore
|
|-
|Win
|align=center|4–0
|Aleandro Caetano
|Decision (unanimous)
|LDH Martial Arts: Pound Storm
|
|align=center|3
|align=center|5:00
|Tokyo, Japan
|
|-
|Win
|align=center|3–0
|Yasuyuki Nojiri
|TKO (punches)
|Shooto 2022 Vol. 1
|
|align=center|1
|align=center|0:25
|Tokyo, Japan
|
|-
|Win
|align=center|2–0
|Akuri Ronda
|KO (head kick)
|Shooto 2021 Vol. 5
|
|align=center|2
|align=center|0:20
|Tokyo, Japan
|
|-
|Win
|align=center|1–0
|Takumi Arai
|KO (punch)
|Fighting Dreamers
|
|align=center|1
|align=center|0:42
|Japan
|
|-

Freestyle record 

! colspan="7"| Senior Freestyle Matches
|-
!  Res.
!  Record
!  Opponent
!  Score
!  Date
!  Event
!  Location
|-
! style=background:white colspan=7 |
|-
|Loss
|36–9
|align=left| Takuto Otoguro
|style="font-size:88%"|TF 0–10
|style="font-size:88%" rowspan=5|19–22 December 2019
|style="font-size:88%" rowspan=5|2019 Japanese National Championships
|style="text-align:left;font-size:88%;" rowspan=5|
 Tokyo, Japan
|-
|Win
|36–8
|align=left| Takuma Taniyama
|style="font-size:88%"|TF 11–0
|-
|Win
|35–8
|align=left| Masakazu Kamoi
|style="font-size:88%"|9–5
|-
|Win
|34–8
|align=left| Isojiro
|style="font-size:88%"|TF 11–0
|-
|Win
|33–8
|align=left| Yamato Hagiwara
|style="font-size:88%"|4–2
|-
! style=background:white colspan=7 |
|-
|Win
|
|align=left| Rei Higuchi
|style="font-size:88%"|INJ
|style="font-size:88%" rowspan=5|20–23 December 2018
|style="font-size:88%" rowspan=5|2018 Japanese National Championships
|style="text-align:left;font-size:88%;" rowspan=5|
 Tokyo, Japan
|-
|Win
|32–8
|align=left| Hirotaka Abe
|style="font-size:88%"|8–3
|-
|Loss
|31–8
|align=left| Takuto Otoguro
|style="font-size:88%"|TF 0–10
|-
|Win
|31–7
|align=left| Fukuda Toki
|style="font-size:88%"|TF 12–2
|-
|Win
|30–7
|align=left| Takuya Funaki
|style="font-size:88%"|TF 10–0
|-
! style=background:white colspan=7 |
|-
|Loss
|
|align=left| Hirotaka Abe
|style="font-size:88%"|INJ
|style="font-size:88%" rowspan=2|14–17 June 2018
|style="font-size:88%" rowspan=2|2018 Meiji Cup (JPN World Team Trials)
|style="text-align:left;font-size:88%;" rowspan=2|
 Tokyo, Japan
|-
|Win
|29–7
|align=left| Koki Terada
|style="font-size:88%"|13–7
|-
! style=background:white colspan=7 |
|-
|Win
|28–7
|align=left| Sandeep Tomar
|style="font-size:88%"|TF 11–0
|style="font-size:88%" rowspan=2|7–8 April 2018
|style="font-size:88%" rowspan=2|2018 World Cup
|style="text-align:left;font-size:88%;" rowspan=2|
 Iowa City, Iowa
|-
|Win
|27–7
|align=left| Lasha Lomtadze
|style="font-size:88%"|9–2
|-
! style=background:white colspan=7 |
|-
|Win
|26–7
|align=left| Kuat Amirtaev
|style="font-size:88%"|TF 12–2
|style="font-size:88%" rowspan=4|21–26 November 2017
|style="font-size:88%" rowspan=4|2017 U23 World Championships
|style="text-align:left;font-size:88%;" rowspan=4|
 Bydgoszcz, Poland
|-
|Win
|25–7
|align=left| Islam Dudaev
|style="font-size:88%"|TF 10–0
|-
|Win
|24–7
|align=left| Husein Shakhbanau
|style="font-size:88%"|10–4
|-
|Win
|23–7
|align=left| Gabriel Janatsch
|style="font-size:88%"|TF 11–0
|-
! style=background:white colspan=7 |
|-
|Loss
|22–7
|align=left| Yowlys Bonne
|style="font-size:88%"|Fall
|style="font-size:88%" rowspan=5|25 August 2017
|style="font-size:88%" rowspan=5|2017 World Championships
|style="text-align:left;font-size:88%;" rowspan=5|
 Paris, France
|-
|Win
|22–6
|align=left| Mykola Bolotňuk
|style="font-size:88%"|TF 10–0
|-
|Win
|21–6
|align=left| Alibek Osmonov
|style="font-size:88%"|TF 10–0
|-
|Loss
|20–6
|align=left| Haji Aliyev
|style="font-size:88%"|1–10
|-
|Win
|20–5
|align=left| Andrei Prepeliţă
|style="font-size:88%"|7–3
|-
! style=background:white colspan=7 |
|-
|Win
|19–5
|align=left| Rei Higuchi
|style="font-size:88%"|9–5
|style="font-size:88%" rowspan=4|16–18 June 2017
|style="font-size:88%" rowspan=4|2017 Meiji Cup (JPN World Team Trials)
|style="text-align:left;font-size:88%;" rowspan=4|
 Tokyo, Japan
|-
|Win
|18–5
|align=left| Rei Higuchi
|style="font-size:88%"|14–5
|-
|Win
|17–5
|align=left| Shoya Shimae
|style="font-size:88%"|TF 10–0
|-
|Win
|16–5
|align=left| Sakaki Daimu
|style="font-size:88%"|TF 10–0
|-
! style=background:white colspan=7 |
|-
|Loss
|15–5
|align=left| Timur Aitkulov
|style="font-size:88%"|Fall
|style="font-size:88%" rowspan=3|8–9 April 2017
|style="font-size:88%" rowspan=3|2017 Dan Kolov - Nikola Petrov Memorial
|style="text-align:left;font-size:88%;" rowspan=3|
 Madrid, Spain
|-
|Win
|15–4
|align=left| Kairat Amirtayev
|style="font-size:88%"|TF 12–1
|-
|Win
|14–4
|align=left| Amar Laissaoui
|style="font-size:88%"|Fall
|-
! style=background:white colspan=7 |
|-
|Win
|13–4
|align=left| Yuki Takahashi
|style="font-size:88%"|TF 10–0
|style="font-size:88%" rowspan=3|27–29 May 2016
|style="font-size:88%" rowspan=3|2016 Meiji Cup (JPN World Team Trials)
|style="text-align:left;font-size:88%;" rowspan=3|
 Tokyo, Japan
|-
|Win
|12–4
|align=left| Gaku Akazawa
|style="font-size:88%"|TF 10–0
|-
|Win
|11–4
|align=left| Toshihiro Hasegawa
|style="font-size:88%"|TF 10–0
|-
! style=background:white colspan=7 |
|-
|Win
|10–4
|align=left| Yasuhiro Morita
|style="font-size:88%"|TF 10–0
|style="font-size:88%" rowspan=4|21–23 December 2015
|style="font-size:88%" rowspan=4|2015 Japanese National Championships
|style="text-align:left;font-size:88%;" rowspan=4|
 Tokyo, Japan
|-
|Loss
|9–4
|align=left| Rei Higuchi
|style="font-size:88%"|6–8
|-
|Win
|9–3
|align=left| Gaku Akazawa
|style="font-size:88%"|TF 14–4
|-
|Win
|8–3
|align=left| Yasuhiro Inaba
|style="font-size:88%"|TF 10–0
|-
! style=background:white colspan=7 |
|-
|Loss
|7–3
|align=left| Sung Gwon Kim
|style="font-size:88%"|0–1
|style="font-size:88%" rowspan=4|11 July 2015
|style="font-size:88%" rowspan=4|2015 Grand Prix of Spain
|style="text-align:left;font-size:88%;" rowspan=4|
 Madrid, Spain
|-
|Win
|7–2
|align=left| Juan Pablo Gonzalez
|style="font-size:88%"|9–1
|-
|Win
|6–2
|align=left| Marco Coetzee
|style="font-size:88%"|TF 10–0
|-
|Win
|5–2
|align=left| Amin Nouri
|style="font-size:88%"|TF 13–2
|-
! style=background:white colspan=7 |
|-
|Win
|4–2
|align=left| Yasuhiro Morita
|style="font-size:88%"|TF 11–0
|style="font-size:88%" rowspan=4|19–21 June 2015
|style="font-size:88%" rowspan=4|2015 Meiji Cup (JPN World Team Trials)
|style="text-align:left;font-size:88%;" rowspan=4|
 Tokyo, Japan
|-
|Loss
|3–2
|align=left| Yuki Takahashi
|style="font-size:88%"|0–5
|-
|Win
|3–1
|align=left| Kazuaki Oshiro
|style="font-size:88%"|TF 10–0
|-
|Win
|2–1
|align=left| Toshihiro Hasegawa
|style="font-size:88%"|TF 14–4
|-
! style=background:white colspan=7 |
|-
|Loss
|1–1
|align=left| Fumitaka Morishita
|style="font-size:88%"|2–4
|style="font-size:88%" rowspan=2|21–23 December 2014
|style="font-size:88%" rowspan=2|2014 Japanese National Championships
|style="text-align:left;font-size:88%;" rowspan=2|
 Tokyo, Japan
|-
|Win
|1–0
|align=left| Rei Kuwagi
|style="font-size:88%"|9–7
|-

See also 
 List of current UFC fighters
 List of male mixed martial artists

References 

1995 births
Living people
Japanese male sport wrestlers
Japanese male mixed martial artists
Bantamweight mixed martial artists
Mixed martial artists utilizing freestyle wrestling
People from Saitama (city)
20th-century Japanese people
21st-century Japanese people